"Shirley" is a song originally released by John Fred and the Playboys in December 1958 by Montel Records. It was the band's debut single and reached number 82 on the Billboard Hot 100 in March 1959. The song became an international hit in 1982 when it was covered by Shakin' Stevens, peaking at number 6 on the UK Singles Chart.

John Fred and the Playboys version 
"Shirley" was recorded at Cosimo Matassa's recording studios in New Orleans when John Fred was just 17 years old, after local dance promoter in Baton Rouge, Sam Montalbano was impressed by the band. Fats Domino's backing band helped out on the recording as Domino recorded "Whole Lotta Lovin'" prior to John Fred and the Playboys' recording session. The success of the song led Fred to appear on Alan Freed's New York show The Big Beat. The single might have been more successful had Fred not turned down the opportunity to appear on American Bandstand to instead play for his high school basketball team.

Charts

Shakin' Stevens version 

Shakin' Stevens released a cover of the song in April 1982 under Epic Records as the second single from his album Give Me Your Heart Tonight.

Personnel 

 Shakin' Stevens – vocals
 Mickey Gee – lead guitar
 Geraint Watkins – piano, accordion
 Stuart Colman – bass guitar, producer
 Howard Tibble – drums
 Rod Houison – engineer

Charts

References 

1958 singles
1958 songs
1982 singles
1982 songs
Shakin' Stevens songs
Epic Records singles
Songs written by John Fred